Vladimir Andreevich Yakubovich (October 21, 1926 in Novosibirsk – August 17, 2012 in the Gdov region) was a notable Russian control theorist and head of the Department of Theoretical Cybernetics at Saint Petersburg State University (formerly Leningrad University).

In 1996 he received the IEEE Control Systems Award for his contributions to control theory, including the Kalman–Yakubovich–Popov lemma.

References

External links 
Personal web page (English) 
Personal web page (Russian) 
On-line CV  (includes photo)
 S. Abramovich, N. Kuznetsov, G. Leonov, V. A. Yakubovich — mathematician, “father of the field”, and herald of intellectual democracy in science and society, IFAC-PapersOnLine, 48(11), 2015, 1–3 (video)
Vladimir A. Yakubovich, Automation and Remote Control, 2006, Vol. 67, No. 10, pp. 1530–1546.

Control theorists
Soviet mathematicians
Moscow State University alumni
Corresponding Members of the Russian Academy of Sciences
1926 births
2012 deaths